A story paper is a periodical publication similar to a literary magazine, but featuring illustrations and text stories, and aimed towards children and teenagers. Also known in Britain as "boys' weeklies", story papers were phenomenally popular before the outbreak of the Second World War.

Among the most well-known British story papers was Boy's Own Paper, which ran from 1879 to 1967.

Beginnings
The first known edition of what would later become known as a "story paper" was The Young Gentleman's Magazine, published in 1777. The first story paper to really take off was The Boys' and Girls' Penny Magazine, first published in September 1832.

In 1866, Charles Stephens began selling Boys of England on the English streets for a penny—the first "penny dreadful". Story papers in this style minimized the expense of writing in order to produce an extremely cheap product. Strictly speaking, the "penny dreadful" died off by the turn of the century, but this term was still used to refer to story papers throughout their history. The Halfpenny Marvel, first published in 1893, was "founded to counteract the pernicious influences of the Penny Dreadfuls", according to its title page. A book about these weeklies (also called "bloods" because of their savage contents) was created in 1948 by E. S. Turner, called Boys Will be Boys.

Golden Age

Denis Gifford designated the period between World War I and World War II as the "Golden Age" of story papers. Sales of the story papers were at their highest during these years, as were the fecundity of the authors, the range in genre of magazines, and the colourful variety of the heroes. The most famous story paper hero, Sexton Blake, reached his apex during these years.

World War II caused chaos in Britain, and among other things the story papers had to be shut down as funds were redirected to the war. This is known as the Dark Ages for story papers, and nearly all of the papers ceased printing in 1939 or 1940.

Silver Age and modern comics
In the 1950s and 1960s, some story papers such as The Rover briefly flourished, but television had a growing influence on the attentions of British children. Mergers between publishing houses finished off the remaining story papers, or modified them to become comic books, in the 1970s. The Rover was the last survivor and ceased publishing in 1973.

Format and politics
George Orwell's essay, Boys' Weeklies, outlines the general themes of the story paper in the "Golden Age". As far as Orwell could tell, Britain was the only country in Europe in which story papers were produced. The Gem and The Magnet, the oldest of their kind, featured school serials always centred on a group of characters any reader could identify with. More recent story papers focused on adventure and intrigue, and had a large teenage readership. 

According to Orwell, all of the English papers published at the time were stuck in the 1910s and had an underlying conservative slant, which taught children to be deferential to the upper-class. He suggested socialist values could be just as exciting if they followed the story paper format.

There were story papers for children of both sexes, although there was a broad overlap in the actual readership of the two.

List of story papers

UK

Adventure
Aunt Judy's Magazine
Big Budget
Boy's Best Story Paper
Boys' Broadcast
Boy's Champion
The Boys' Friend
Boys' Magazine
Boys of England
The Boy's Own Paper
The Boys' Herald
 The Boys' Leader
The Boys' Realm
Bullseye
The Captain
The Champion
The Children's Friend
Chums
Dixon Hawke Library
The Dreadnought
The Empire
The Gem
Girl's Best Friend
Girls' Crystal
The Girl's Home
The Girl's Own Paper
Girl's Reader
The Girl's Realm
Girl's Weekly
The Greyfriars Herald
The Hotspur
Halfpenny Marvel
Jabberwock
The Jester
Joker
Lion (boys' magazine)
The Magnet
The Marvel
The Modern Boy
Nelson Lee Library
Our Girls
Pals
Peg's Paper
The Penny Popular
The Pilot
Pluck
Public School Magazine
The Ranger
Red Arrow
The Rover
School and Sport
School Friend
Schoolgirls' Own
Schooldays
The Schoolgirl
Schoolgirls' Weekly
Scout
The Sexton Blake Library
The Skipper
Startler
The Thriller
Tip Top
The Triumph
Union Jack
The Vanguard
The Wizard
Young England magazine
Young Folks

Ireland
Our Boys (Ireland)

Australia
The Silver Jacket

See also
 Penny dreadful
 Pulp magazine
 Dime novel
 History of the British comic

References

External links
British Juvenile Story Papers and Pocket Libraries Index
Collecting Books and Magazines: Story Papers
British Story Papers Flickr Group
University of Minnesota Hess Collection: Story Papers 1850-1910
Story Papers from 110 years of AP / Fleetway / IPC

Periodicals
British children's literature
British culture
Magazine genres